The surname David or Dávid may refer to:

 Dávid family, a Hungarian noble family, based in present-day Slovakia
 Albert David (1902–1945), American naval officer
 Alki David (born 1968), Greek businessman and actor
 Anna David (journalist) (born 1970), American journalist
 Anna David (singer) (born 1984), Danish pop and soul music singer
 Annie Louise David (1877–1960), American harpist
 C. D. David (1860–1920), Indian writer in Malayalam
 Colt David (born 1985), American football player
 Constantin David (1908–1941), Romanian communist activist
 Craig David (born 1981), English musician
 Cristian David (born 1967), Romanian politician
 Damiano David (born 1999), Italian singer-songwriter, lead singer of Måneskin
 Dickie David (1879–1939), Wales national rugby union player
 Edgeworth David (1858–1934), Welsh-Australian geologist and explorer
 Elizabeth David (1913–1992), British cookery writer
 Félicien-César David (1810–1876), French composer
 Ferenc Dávid (1510–1579), founder of the Unitarian Church in Transylvania
 Ferdinand David (musician) (1810–1873), German violinist and composer
 F. R. David (born 1947), Tunisian-born French singer
 Gary David (born 1978), Filipino professional basketball player
 Gerard David (c. 1455–1523), Dutch renaissance painter
 Guy David (footballer) (1947–2008), French football player and coach
 Guy David (mathematician) (born 1957), French mathematician
 Gyula Dávid (1913–1977), Hungarian composer
 Hal David (1921–2012), American lyricist and songwriter
 Hérmine David (1886–1970), French painter
 Jacques David (bishop) (1930–2018), French Roman Catholic prelate
 Jacques-Louis David (1748–1825), French neoclassical painter
 James Burty David (1946–2009), Mauritian politician
 Janina David (born 1930), British writer, Holocaust survivor
 Jason David (born 1982), NFL football player for the New Orleans Saints
 Jim David (born 1954), stand-up comedian, actor, and playwright
 Jim David (1927-2007), American football player
 Johann Nepomuk David (1895–1977), Austrian composer
 Jonathan David (born 2000), Canadian soccer player
 Keith David (born 1956), American voice actor
 Kornél Dávid (born 1971), Hungarian basketball player
 Larry David (born 1947), American comedian, writer, and actor
 Leonardo David (1960–1985), Italian alpine skier
 Leopold David (1878–1924), first mayor of Anchorage, Alaska
 Lukas David (1934–2021), Austrian classical violinist
 Maria Jeyarani David (born 1951), ordained Christian missionary from Malaysia
 Peter David (born 1956), American writer
 Pierre Jean David (1788–1856), called "David d'Angers", French sculptor
 Shani David (born 1991), Israeli women's soccer player
 Stuart David (born 1969), Scottish musician and novelist

Fictional characters 

 Martin David, the main character in the film The Hunter
 Ziva David, a main character in the series NCIS

See also
Davide